Urbanus Henricus Rhegius or Urban Rieger (May 1489, in Langenargen – 23 May 1541, in Celle) was a Protestant Reformer who was active both in Northern and Southern Germany in order to promote Lutheran unity in the Holy Roman Empire. He was also a popular poet. Martin Luther referred to him as the "Bishop of Lower Saxony".

Life 

He was born Urban Rieger, the son of Konrad Rieger, a Catholic priest, and his mistress (priests not being allowed to marry) at Langenargen on Lake Constance.

He was educated at the Latin school in Lindau and then studied arts at Freiburg University. He befriended Wolfgang Capito at the university. After graduating in 1510 he undertook further studies at Ingolstadt University specifically to come under the tutelage of John Eck, graduating MA in 1516. During this period he was created poet laureate by Emperor Maximilian.

In 1519 he went to Konstanz where he befriended Johann Fabri, who encouraged him to train as a preacher, and after brief studies at Tübingen, in 1520 he became a Catholic priest in Augsburg, replacing Johannes Oecolampadius who had left to join the Reform Movement. A condition of this appointment was to gain a doctorate which he did at the University of Basel later that year. From 1521 he began to support the Reform Movement and was a clear admirer of Martin Luther. This forced him to leave his post, and he returned to Langenargen, before going to Hall in the Tyrol where he preached until 1523. Augsburg then invited him to return as preacher for the Carmelite Church of St Anne. Here he began to spread his own ideas in line with the Reform Movement. He initially avoided putting these views in print.

In 1525 he Latinised his name to Urbanus Rhegius. It was under this name that he began publishing Protestant views. He married in this year, usually a forbidden practice as a priest, but accepted in the Protestant views.

From 1527 he began publishing pamphlets against the Anabaptist Movement, which had begun as a rival movement to both Catholicism and Protestantism in that year. In these early years of Protestantism he proved an arbiter of the different views, particularly the different views on the Eucharist, expressed by Luther and Zwingli, and these views won the admiration of Philip of Hesse. In this capacity, in 1530 he was one of the collaborators (along with Luther and others) who created the Augsburg Confession.

He stayed at Augsburg until 1530 then his final role was as superintendent of the Duchy of Lüneberg (under Ernst of Lüneberg), living thereafter at Celle. From 1535 he was a strong advocate of tolerating the Jews within Germany (an uncommon view at that time).

He died in Celle on 27 May 1541.

Works (selected) 
 , 1526
 , 1527
 , 1529
 , 1535
 , 1536

References

 Sebastian Ruf: Doctor Jacob Strauß und Doctor Urban Regius, in: Archiv für Geschichte und Alterthumskunde Tirols 2 (1865) 67-81
 David Schönherr: Franz Schweygers Chronik der Stadt Hall 1303-1572 (Tirolische Geschichtsquellen 1) Innsbruck 1867, 21 und 80-82
 Maximilian Liebmann: Urbanus Rhegius und die Anfänge der Reformation : Beiträge zu seinem Leben, seiner Lehre und seinem Wirken bis zum Augsburger Reichstag von 1530 ; mit einer Bibliographie seiner Schriften. Aschendorff´, Münster 1980
 Hellmut Zschoch: Reformatorische Existenz und konfessionelle Identität. Urbanus Rhegius als evangelischer Theologe in den Jahren 1520 bis 1530 (Beiträge zur historischen Theologie 88) Tübingen 1995
 Heinz Moser, Waldaufstiftung Hall in Tirol. Urkunden aus den Jahren 1490-1856 (Tiroler Geschichtsquellen 44) Innsbruck 2000, 42-46
 Romedio Schmitz-Esser, Von entlaufenen Nonnen und charismatischen Predigern. Die Lehren Luthers und ihr Niederschlag in Hall in Tirol, in: Tiroler Heimatblätter 82/1 (2007) 12–18.
 Julius August Wagenmann: Rhegius, Urbanus. In: Allgemeine Deutsche Biographie (ADB). Bd. 28, S. 374–378.

Biographies 
 Dietmar Lamprecht: Urbanus Rhegius: der vergessene Reformator der Lüneburger Heide ; eine Erinnerung. Missionsbuchhandlung, Hermannsburg 1980.  
 Prof. Eduard Hindelang (Hrsg.), Walter König: Der Reformator Urbanus Rhegius - Chronik einer Familie zwischen Langenargen und Finkenwerder.

External links 
 
https://web.archive.org/web/20071130150939/http://luther.hki.uni-koeln.de/luther/pages/sucheDrucke.html
http://www.gbv.de (Online-Ressourcen wählen)
http://www.philological.bham.ac.uk/bibliography/r.html Nachweis lateinischer Schriften

 http://www.uni-mannheim.de/mateo/camenaref/adam/adam4/s100.html Lateinische Kurzbiographie

1489 births
1541 deaths
German Lutheran theologians
16th-century German Protestant theologians
German Protestant Reformers
German male non-fiction writers
16th-century German male writers